Teymanak-e Sofla (also Romanized as Teymanak-e Soflá; also known as Teymanak-e Pā’īn) is a village in Jolgeh-ye Musaabad Rural District, in the Central District of Torbat-e Jam County, Razavi Khorasan Province, Iran. At the 2006 census, its population was 1,074, in 241 families.

References 

Populated places in Torbat-e Jam County